Goldman Sachs Capital Partners is the private equity arm of Goldman Sachs, focused on leveraged buyout and growth capital investments globally. The group, which is based in New York City, was founded in 1986. As of 2019, GS Capital Partners had raised approximately $39.9 billion since inception across seven funds and has invested over $17 billion.

History
Goldman Sachs has historically invested capital in a variety of businesses alongside its investment banking clients. In the early and mid-1980s, Goldman was a slow entrant into the financing of leveraged buyouts and junk bonds and preferred to focus on its traditional mergers and acquisitions advisory business. Beginning in 1983, however, Goldman began making longer-term equity investments in private equity transactions that came through its investment banking and other clients.

Goldman Sachs Capital Partners was founded in 1986, at the same time that similar groups were founded at other investment banks including Lehman Brothers Merchant Banking, Morgan Stanley Capital Partners and DLJ Merchant Banking Partners.  Goldman established investment partnerships that allowed its clients to participate alongside the firm in private equity transactions.

On April 23, 2007, Goldman closed GS Capital Partners VI with $20 billion in committed capital, $11 billion from institutional and high-net-worth investors and $9 billion from Goldman Sachs and its employees. In late 2019, Goldman's Chief Executive, David M. Solomon, announced that the firm would combine GS Capital Partners into one division with Goldman's other direct-investing units, such as the Special Situations Group and Growth Equity unit, called the Merchant Banking Division (MBD), which added up to $140 billion under management.

Investment funds
Since 1992, GSCP has raised third party capital as well as investing on behalf of Goldman, its clients and its employees through institutional private equity funds.  GSCP's third party investors include pension funds, insurance companies, endowments, fund of funds, high-net-worth individuals, sovereign wealth funds and other institutional investors.

As of the end of 2008, GSCP had completed fundraising for seven investment funds with total committed capital of approximately US$39.9 billion:

Source: Preqin

Investments
GS Capital Partners emerged in the late 1990s as one of the largest private equity investors globally competing and partnering with the largest independent firms, Kohlberg Kravis Roberts, Blackstone Group, Bain Capital, Carlyle Group and TPG Capital.  Since the raising of its Goldman Sachs Capital Partners 2000 Fund, GS Capital Partners has completed some of the most notable leveraged buyouts:

In addition to its successful buyout transactions, Goldman was involved in the high-profile failed buyout of Harman International Industries , an upscale audio equipment maker.  On April 26, 2007, Harman announced it had entered an agreement to be acquired by GS Capital Partners and Kohlberg Kravis Roberts.  As the financing markets became more adverse in the summer of 2007, the buyout was on tenuous ground.  In September 2007, Goldman and KKR backed out of the $8 billion buyout of Harman. By the end of the day, Harman's shares had plummeted by more than 24% on the news.

References

External links
Goldman Sachs Capital Partners (company website)

Goldman Sachs
Investment banking private equity groups
Mezzanine capital investment firms
Private equity firms of the United States
Financial services companies based in New York City
American companies established in 1986
Financial services companies established in 1986
1986 establishments in New York (state)